Roeboides is a genus of characins from Central and South America. These fish, among other characteristics, are small, are typically translucent, and have a rhomboid shape.

Species
The 21 currently recognized species in this genus are:
 Roeboides affinis (Günther, 1868)
 Roeboides araguaito C. A. S. de Lucena, 2003
 Roeboides biserialis (Garman, 1890)
 Roeboides bouchellei Fowler, 1923 (Crystal tetra)
 Roeboides bussingi Matamoros, Chakrabarty, Angulo, Garita-Alvarado & McMahan, 2013
 Roeboides carti C. A. S. de Lucena, 2000
 Roeboides dayi (Steindachner, 1878)
 Roeboides descalvadensis Fowler, 1932 (Parana scale-eating characin)
 Roeboides dientonito L. P. Schultz, 1944
 Roeboides dispar C. A. S. de Lucena, 2001
 Roeboides guatemalensis (Günther, 1864) (Guatemalan headstander)
 Roeboides ilseae W. A. Bussing, 1986
 Roeboides loftini C. A. S. de Lucena, 2011
 Roeboides margareteae C. A. S. de Lucena, 2003
 Roeboides microlepis (J. T. Reinhardt, 1851)
 Roeboides myersii T. N. Gill, 1870
 Roeboides numerosus C. A. S. de Lucena, 2000
 Roeboides occidentalis Meek & Hildebrand, 1916
 Roeboides oligistos C. A. S. de Lucena, 2000
 Roeboides sazimai C. A. S. de Lucena, 2007
 Roeboides xenodon (J. T. Reinhardt, 1851)

References

Characidae
Taxa named by Albert Günther